Coleman Gannon (born November 21, 2002) is an American soccer player who currently plays for the Columbus Crew 2 in MLS Next Pro.

Club career 
On March 8, 2020, Gannon appeared as a 62nd-minute substitute for Atlanta United's USL Championship side Atlanta United 2 during a 1–0 loss to Charleston Battery.

Gannon committed to play collegiate soccer for the Indiana Hoosiers in November 2020, however in July he opted instead to forgo his college eligibility to pursue professional opportunities.

On March 18, 2022, Gannon signed with Columbus Crew 2 in MLS Next Pro.

Honors 
Columbus Crew 2
MLS Next Pro: 2022

References

External links

2002 births
Living people
American soccer players
Association football midfielders
Atlanta United 2 players
Soccer players from Atlanta
USL Championship players
Columbus Crew 2 players
MLS Next Pro players